WHUP-LP/104.7 is an American radio station owned by Hillsborough Community Media. It is licensed to serve Hillsborough, North Carolina. The station airs a community radio format. The callsign WHUP-LP was issued by the Federal Communications Commission on April 17, 2014, and began broadcasting in October 2015.

References

External links

Community radio stations in the United States
HUP-LP
Radio stations established in 2015
HUP-LP
Companies based in Hillsborough, North Carolina
Orange County, North Carolina